The women's 200 metre breaststroke event at the 2010 Asian Games took place on 17 November 2010 at Guangzhou Aoti Aquatics Centre.

There were 16 competitors from 10 different countries who took part in this event. Two heats were held, the heat in which a swimmer competed did not formally matter for advancement, as the swimmers with the top eight times from the entire field qualified for the finals.

Jeong Da-rae from South Korea won the gold medal, it was the first gold medal for Korean female swimmers since 1998 Asian Games. Sun Ye and Ji Liping of People's Republic of China won the silver and bronze medal respectively.

Schedule
All times are China Standard Time (UTC+08:00)

Records

Results

Heats

Final

References

 16th Asian Games Results

External links 
 Women's 200m Breaststroke Heats Official Website
 Women's 200m Breaststroke Ev.No.29 Final Official Website

Swimming at the 2010 Asian Games